Ellis Jacob  (born 1953) is a Canadian business executive who serves as the president and chief executive officer of Cineplex Entertainment.

Since 1987, he has been involved in the movie theatre industry. He was the founder of Galaxy Entertainment Inc. in 1999 and has been the President and CEO of Cineplex Galaxy since November 2003. Under his leadership, he opened several movie theatres along with the expansion of arcades, restaurants and e-sports.

Early life
Jacob was born in 1953 in Calcutta, West Bengal to  Jewish parents, Raymond and Tryphosa. He and his family immigrated to Canada in 1969 to attend his sister's wedding and remained there since.

Career

Early years
His first career as a businessperson began at Ford Motor Company of Canada and Motorola.

Cineplex Odeon Corporation
Ellis Jacob's entry into the film exhibition business took place in October 1987 when he joined Cineplex Odeon Corporation as its chief financial officer. Under his role, he helped bring the upstart movie chain back from the brink by 1993, and was promoted to chief operating officer in 1996.

In 1998, he left Cineplex Odeon after the company merged with Loews Theatres to form Loews Cineplex Entertainment.

Galaxy Cinemas and Cineplex Entertainment
After leaving Cineplex Odeon, Jacob served as the head of integration of Alliance Atlantis who merged two companies in 1998. Shortly in October 1999, Jacob and Gerry Schwartz (CEO of Onex Corporation) founded Galaxy Cinemas with their mission to build 20 theatres in small and medium-sized cities across Canada.

On November 26, 2003, Jacob became the CEO of the newly merged Cineplex Galaxy Income Fund which consisted of Galaxy Cinemas and the Canadian assets of the restructured Loews Cineplex which brought the chains to 86. In June 2005, Cineplex Galaxy acquired Famous Players from National Amusements, under Jacob's watch, doubled its size.

Since the 2010s, Jacob began expanding several concepts beyond movie theatres such as the launch of The Rec Room and foraying into eSports and Digital Media.

Personal life
Jacob is married to Sharyn, with whom he has 2 daughters named Lauren and Resa. He speaks Hindi, English, French, and many other dialects.

On March 14, 2013, Jacob opened the family theatre in his mother's honor at the Baycrest Health Sciences in North York. His mother, who died in 2010, was a resident there.

Awards and honors
Member of Order of Canada (2010)
Member of Order of Ontario (2020)

References

External links
Ellis Jacob biography

Canadian businesspeople
Canadian Jews
Indian Jews
Indian emigrants to Canada
Members of the Order of Canada
People of Indian-Jewish descent
Cineplex Entertainment
1954 births
Living people